The 1969 All-Ireland Senior Football Championship Final was the 82nd All-Ireland Final and the deciding match of the 1969 All-Ireland Senior Football Championship, an inter-county Gaelic football tournament for the top teams in Ireland.

Match

Summary
Kerry claimed a three-point win, thanks mostly to three great saves by goalkeeper Johnny Culloty.

This was also the first Championship meeting of Kerry and Offaly.

Half-time entertainment was provided by way of an Irish dancing routine from the "Hurling Boys from Omagh", County Tyrone.

Details

Linesmen:

Sideline Official

References

All-Ireland Senior Football Championship Final
All-Ireland Senior Football Championship Final, 1969
All-Ireland Senior Football Championship Finals
All-Ireland Senior Football Championship Finals
Kerry county football team matches
Offaly county football team matches